Mars Red (stylized as MARS RED) is a Japanese anime television series produced by Signal.MD. It is based on a stage reading play written by Bun-O Fujisawa. The series aired from April to June 2021.

Plot
In 1923, the Japanese government creates a new unit ("Code Zero") within the army to counter the rising threat of vampires, as well as their artificial blood source. Code Zero offers all vampires the same choice: surrender and receive benefits such as blood and formal registration, or face eradication.

The vampires themselves defy classification, exhibiting a great deal of variation among their ranks and little loyalty towards each other. Though all were once human, most people who are bitten die immediately. Those who become common vamps are simply staggering, mindless predators, while "noble" vampires are far more intelligent and refined (though no less cruel). Still others are able to hold on to their human natures and long for a sense of belonging in an increasingly hostile world.

As the members of Code Zero carry out their mission, they encounter strange vampires, humans, and phenomena that force them to question their own identities and purpose.

Characters

A stern man who has dedicated his life to the military. As Colonel, he leads Code Zero, a small ragtag unit of vampire soldiers.

A member of Code Zero. Kurusu is a sensitive young man who is able to retain to his humanity, despite being an A-rank vampire of considerable strength.

Another member of Code Zero, designated as an "unranked" vampire with few powers. As a human, he served alongside Maeda and considers him a friend.

A member of Code Zero who specializes in stealth operations. He has white hair and appears young, but has lived for hundreds of years. He covers the lower half of his face with a mask at all times.

Code Zero's scientist and engineer. He is brilliant, eccentric, and cheerful. Takeuchi seldom engages in battle but assists greatly with his inventions and plans.

Maeda's commanding officer, with whom he has a personal connection. His primary goal is to establish a military force composed of undying vampire soldiers.

A talented actor who develops a bond with both Misaki and Aoi. His outward appearance is child-like, but he has tremendous presence and maturity.

A fearless reporter for the local newspaper, she is fascinated with vampires as well as the performing arts. She has known Kurusu since childhood.

An up-and-coming stage actress who performs alongside Defrott. She is engaged to Maeda, but has yet to meet him.

A mysterious, elegant young man who provides safe refuge for vampires.

A foreigner with connections to vampire nobility as well as the military.

Media

Manga
A manga adaptation of the reading play by Kemuri Karakara was run in Monthly Comic Garden from January 4, 2020 to July 5, 2021 and was compiled into three volumes. Seven Seas Entertainment published the manga in North America.

Anime
On February 6, 2020, Yomiuri-TV Enterprise LTD announced their 50th Anniversary project, a new anime television series directed by Kōhei Hatano to be co-produced by Funimation. The series is animated by Signal.MD, with Junichi Fujisaku writing the series' scripts, Yukari Takeuchi adapting the character designs originally by Kemuri Karakara, and Toshiyuki Muranaka composing the series' music. The series aired from April 6 to June 29, 2021 on YTV and other channels. The first episode was given a premiere screening on Funimation one week before the Japanese broadcast, in both subtitled and dubbed options. Following Sony's acquisition of Crunchyroll, the series was moved to Crunchyroll.

Mobile game
A free-to-play smartphone adventure game titled Mars Red: Edge of the Nightmare (Kawataredoki no Uta) was announced on February 20, 2021 and released on May 20, 2021 in Japan and worldwide on July 9, 2021. The game was developed by D-techno and franchise creator Bun'O Fujisawa created an original story.

Notes

References

External links
Manga official website 
Anime official website  

2021 anime television series debuts
2021 video games
Adventure games
Android (operating system) games
Free-to-play video games
Crunchyroll anime
IG Port franchises
IOS games
Mag Garden manga
Seven Seas Entertainment titles
Shōnen manga
Signal.MD
Taishō period in fiction
Television series set in the 1920s
Television shows based on plays
Yomiuri Telecasting Corporation original programming
Vampires in anime and manga